Maurice Day may refer to:

 Maurice Day (bishop of Clogher) (1843–1923), Anglican bishop
 Maurice Day (bishop of Cashel and Waterford) (1816–1904), Church of Ireland bishop
 Maurice Day (Dean of Waterford) (1858–1916), Irish Anglican priest
 Maurice William Day (1858–1916), Irish Anglican priest
 Maurice "Jake" Day (1892–1983) American illustrator

See also
Morris Day (born 1957), American musician, composer, and actor
Morris Day (Viz), fictional comic character